Enrico Schnabel (born 13 January 1974 in Dresden) is a German rower.

References 
 
 

1974 births
Living people
Rowers from Dresden
Olympic rowers of Germany
Rowers at the 2004 Summer Olympics
World Rowing Championships medalists for Germany
German male rowers